This is a list of the 50 U.S. states, the 5 populated U.S. territories, and the District of Columbia by race/ethnicity. It includes a sortable table of population by race /ethnicity. The table excludes Hispanics from the racial categories, assigning them to their own category. The table also excludes all mixed raced/multiracial persons from the racial categories, assigning them to their own category.

Race/ethnicity by U.S. state and territory

References

United States States And Territories By race ethnicity
race ethnicity
Lists of subdivisions of the United States
United States demography-related lists
United States geography-related lists
United States, race ethnicity